Nybro Municipality (Nybro kommun) is a municipality in Kalmar County, south-eastern Sweden, with its seat in the town Nybro.

The amalgamation of the City of Nybro (instituted in 1932) with its surrounding municipalities took place in 1969.

The municipality was inhabited by a few hundred people until the railways came in the late 19th century, and the town Nybro was in its location between Kalmar on the east coast and Gothenburg on the west coast; later also on the railway from Kalmar and Malmö in the south-west. Until then Nybro mostly consisted of minor industries, including a match factory, marked by its traditionally Småland forest nature, largely unsuitable for agriculture.

Nybro Municipality is in the eastern part of the "Kingdom of Crystal" area (Swedish: Glasriket), that covers a total of four municipalities.

Localities
There are nine urban areas (also called localities, Swedish: tätorter) in Nybro Municipality.

In the table the localities are listed according to the size of the population as of December 31, 2005. The municipal seat is in bold characters.

See also
The Bäckebo Bomb

References
Statistics Sweden

External links

Official site
 Article Nybro from Nordisk Familjebok

Municipalities of Kalmar County